The Croats have a minority in Boka Kotorska (Bay of Kotor), a coastal region in Montenegro, the largest of their kind in Tivat. The three municipalities making up the Bay of Kotor (Tivat, Kotor and Herceg-Novi) include 4,519 Croats or 6.70%. They are also known as Bokelji, a common name for all inhabitants for of Boka Kotorska. Tivat is home to the minority political party Croatian Civic Initiative, and to the National Council of Croats in Montenegro. Kotor is home to Croatian Civic Society of Montenegro.

Religion 
Many Croats in this region are followers of the Roman Catholic Church. The Roman Catholic Diocese of Kotor in Kotor is part of the Archdiocese of Split-Makarska in Croatia and its faithful are mostly the Croats in Boka.

Places of worship
Our Lady of the Rocks
Cathedral of Saint Tryphon

Demographics 
Settlements in Montenegro with significant Croatian minority (10 percent or more) include (2011):

Bogdašići (27 or 47,37%)
Donja Lastva (315 or 41,94%)
Lepetani (53 or 28,80%)
Strp (12 or 24%)
Krašići (27 or 20,77%)
Muo (115 or 18,58%)
Bogišići (33 or 17,93%)
Tivat (1,622 or 17,31%)
Donji Stoliv (58 or 16,67%)
Prčanj (170 or 15,04%)
Kavač (93 or 13,86%)
Kotor (113 or 11,76%)
Škaljari (415 or 10,90%)

Croatian Civic Society of Montenegro
The Croatian Civic Society of Montenegro is a Croat community organisation in Montenegro. Their headquarters is located in the coastal town of Kotor, in the Boka kotorska region of Montenegro.

Notable people 

Marta Batinović, Montenegrin handball player
Tihomil Beritić, physician
Luka Brajnović, university professor and journalist
Ivan Brkanović, writer
Tomislav Crnković, Croatian football player
Vjenceslav Čižek, poet
blessed Gracija of Muo, Augustinian and hermit
Ilija Janjić, Bishop
Leopold Mandić, Catholic saint
Franjo Kunčer, motorsport racer
Andrija Maurović, comic book author
Nikola Modruški, Bishop of Modruš
Božo Nikolić, sea captain and politician
Josip Pečarić, mathematician
Matea Pletikosić, Montenegrin handball player
Branko Sbutega, priest and writer
Milan Sijerković, meteorologists
Viktor Vida, writer
Marija Vučinović, politician
Predrag Vušović, actor

See also  
 Croatia–Montenegro relations
 Croatian Confraternity Bokelj Navy 809.
 Montenegrins of Croatia

References

External links
 Croatian Civic Society of Montenegro

 
Ethnic groups in Montenegro